The Daytime Emmy Award for Outstanding Talk Show Host is an award presented annually by the National Academy of Television Arts and Sciences (NATAS) to honor daytime talk show hosts. It was first awarded at the 1st Daytime Emmy Awards ceremony held in 1974. From the 42nd Daytime Emmy Awards in 2015 to the 49th Daytime Emmy Awards in 2022, the award was divided into two specific categories: Outstanding Informative Talk Show Host, honoring hosts of talk shows that were more informative in nature, and Outstanding Entertainment Talk Show Host, honoring hosts of talk shows that were more entertainment in nature. In 2023, the NATAS will merge the two specific categories back into one. 

In the lists below, the winner of the award for each year is shown first, followed by the other nominees.

1970s 

1974: Dinah Shore, Dinah's Place
1975: Barbara Walters, Today
1976: Dinah Shore, Dinah!
1977: Phil Donahue, The Phil Donahue Show
1978: Phil Donahue, The Phil Donahue Show
1979: Phil Donahue, The Phil Donahue Show

1980s 

1980: Phil Donahue, The Phil Donahue Show
1981: Hugh Downs, Over Easy
1982: Phil Donahue, The Phil Donahue Show
1983: Phil Donahue, The Phil Donahue Show
1984: Gary Collins, Hour Magazine
1985: Phil Donahue, The Phil Donahue Show
1986: Phil Donahue, The Phil Donahue Show
1987: Oprah Winfrey, The Oprah Winfrey Show
1988: Phil Donahue, The Phil Donahue Show
1989: Sally Jessy Raphael, Sally Jessy Raphael

1990s 

1990: Joan Rivers, The Joan Rivers Show
1991: Oprah Winfrey, The Oprah Winfrey Show
1992: Oprah Winfrey, The Oprah Winfrey Show 
1993: Oprah Winfrey, The Oprah Winfrey Show
1994: Oprah Winfrey, The Oprah Winfrey Show
1995: Oprah Winfrey, The Oprah Winfrey Show
1996: Montel Williams, The Montel Williams Show
1997: Rosie O'Donnell, The Rosie O'Donnell Show
1998: Rosie O'Donnell, The Rosie O'Donnell Show and Oprah Winfrey, The Oprah Winfrey Show (tie)
1999: Rosie O'Donnell, The Rosie O'Donnell Show

2000s 

2000: Rosie O'Donnell, The Rosie O'Donnell Show
2001: Regis Philbin, Live with Regis and Rosie O'Donnell, The Rosie O'Donnell Show (tie)
2002: Rosie O'Donnell, The Rosie O'Donnell Show
2003: Wayne Brady, The Wayne Brady Show
2004: Wayne Brady, The Wayne Brady Show
2005: Ellen DeGeneres, The Ellen DeGeneres Show
2006: Ellen DeGeneres, The Ellen DeGeneres Show
2007: Ellen DeGeneres, The Ellen DeGeneres Show
2008: Ellen DeGeneres, The Ellen DeGeneres Show
2009: Whoopi Goldberg, Joy Behar, Elisabeth Hasselbeck, Sherri Shepherd & Barbara Walters, The View

2010s

References

"The Emmy Awards." The 2003 People Almanac. New York: Cader Books, 2002.

Daytime Emmy Awards